Citrus gracilis, the Humpty Doo lime or Kakadu lime, is a straggly shrub endemic to eucalypt savannah woodlands of Northern Territory, Australia.

Citrus gracilis is similar to the New Guinea species Citrus wintersii but with much larger fruits. The leaves are small and slender, and the bark is corky.

References

External links
Finding Citrus gracilis - part 1
Finding Citrus gracilis - part 2

Bushfood
gracilis
Flora of the Northern Territory
Sapindales of Australia
Plants described in 1998
gracilis